Pains Hill may refer to:

Pains Hill, a hamlet in the parish of Limpsfield, Surrey, England
Painshill, a landscaped park near Cobham, Surrey, England